The Roman Catholic Diocese of Gregorio de Laferrere (erected 25 November 2000) is in Argentina and is a suffragan of the Archdiocese of Buenos Aires.

Ordinaries
Juan Horacio Suárez (25 November 2000 − 19 December 2013)
Gabriel Bernardo Barba (1 March 2014 – 9 June 2020), appointed Bishop of San Luis
Jorge Martín Torres Carbonell (30 June 2020 – present)

External links and references
 

Gregorio de Laferrere
Gregorio de Laferrere
Gregorio de Laferrere
La Matanza Partido
Gregorio de Laferrere